Babergh District Council in Suffolk, England is elected every four years. Since the last boundary changes in 2003, 43 councillors have been elected from 26 wards.

Political control
Since the first election to the council in 1973 political control of the council has been held by the following parties:

Leadership
Prior to 2014 there was no formal position of leader of the council at Babergh, with political leadership provided instead by the chair of the policy and resources committee, or its successor, the strategy committee. From 2014 onwards, the chair of the strategy committee was also given the title of leader. The council then moved from a committee system to a leader and cabinet model in 2017, giving the leader additional powers to make executive decisions. The leaders (or chairs of policy and resources / strategy committees) since 1998 have been:

Council elections
1973 Babergh District Council election
1976 Babergh District Council election
1979 Babergh District Council election (New ward boundaries)
1983 Babergh District Council election
1987 Babergh District Council election
1991 Babergh District Council election (District boundary changes took place but the number of seats remained the same)
1995 Babergh District Council election
1999 Babergh District Council election
2003 Babergh District Council election (New ward boundaries)
2007 Babergh District Council election
2011 Babergh District Council election
2015 Babergh District Council election
2019 Babergh District Council election

District result maps

By-election results

1993-1997

1997-2001

2007-2011

2011-2015

See also
Politics of England

References

By-election results

External links
Babergh District Council website

 
Council elections in Suffolk

District council elections in England